The Work is the fourth studio album by American progressive metal band Rivers of Nihil. The album was released on September 24, 2021 via Metal Blade Records. It is the fourth and last album in the band's tetralogy based around the four seasons; it represents winter. It was elected by Loudwire as the 22nd best rock/metal album of 2021. It is also the last album to feature lead vocalist Jake Dieffenbach before his departure in 2022.

Background and album synopsis
Following the release of Where Owls Know My Name, Rivers of Nihil experienced an upward trajectory in their career; the album charted 61st on the Billboard 200, which allowed the band members to commit to the band full time. However, early 2020 the COVID-19 pandemic hit, which, combined with the new expectations of following up a successful album, took a toll on the band's mental health, which in turn was reflected in the material which, in Biggs' words, "definitely got a little hopeless". 

While Biggs originally planned to call the album "Static Gray", during the tour cycle for Owls he began to reframe the album around the concept of work, both as the band's new day job, but also the "emotional, financial, creative" effort that someone must make in society. The songs "The Void From Which No Sound Escapes" and "MORE?" revolve around the demands and expectations of the band's audience, while "Focus" explores Biggs' experience of having prescribed amphetamines as a child, and the psychological addiction that develops.

Track listing

Personnel 

Rivers of Nihil
 Jake Dieffenbach – lead vocals
 Brody Uttley – lead guitar, acoustic guitar, keyboards, programming
 Adam Biggs – bass, vocals
 Jonathan Topore – rhythm guitar
 Jared Klein – drums, vocals

Additional musicians
 Zach Strouse – saxophone
 Grant McFarland – cello on "The Void From Which No Sound Escapes"
 James Dorton (from Black Crown Initiate) – vocals on "Episode" and "Terrestria IV: The Work"
 Stephan Lopez – vocals

References

External links
 
  The Work at Metal Blade

2021 albums
Metal Blade Records albums
Rivers of Nihil albums